Lipa is a village in the Municipality of Miren-Kostanjevica in the Littoral region of Slovenia.

History

During the First World War, Lipa was directly to the rear of the Austro-Hungarian front line. A military hospital was set up in the village, and many of the village's houses were destroyed during the war. There are two Austro-Hungarian military cemeteries directly northeast of Lipa; their central monuments are preserved, but the individual grave markers no longer remain.

Church

The local church is dedicated to the Archangel Michael and belongs to the Parish of Temnica.

References

External links

Lipa on Geopedia

Populated places in the Municipality of Miren-Kostanjevica